Gryzow may refer to:
Gryzów, Masovian Voivodeship, Poland
Gryżów, Opole Voivodeship, Poland